Democracy Rising was an American organization founded in 2001 to oppose corporate corruption. It later became an organization opposed to the military actions of the United States against Iraq and, after the Iraq War, to promote an exit strategy to end the occupation of Iraq. 

It began with three volunteers, Jason Kafoury (National Coordinator), Matthew Zawisky (National Organizer), and Richard Martin (National Operations Manager and Web Administrator). It collaboratively organized stadium and smaller sized manifestations called "Super Rallies" across the Eastern United States (Tampa, Florida,  Wall Street, New York, Buffalo, New York, Trenton, New Jersey, and others) under the umbrella of a 501 (c)(4) non-profit organization (US Federal EIN # 54-2043043) that had been founded by Ralph Nader.  It focused on corporate corruption during the run up and aftershock of the Enron debacle, and eventually merged into an anti-war group led by Kevin Zeese following the 2004 elections.  At that time, it changed its website domain from a "democracyrising.org" to "democracyrising.us".    

It was then that it became a member of United for Peace and Justice. Its web site hosted Ralph Nader's interactive blog and one by Kevin Zeese, director of the organization and a 2006 U.S. Senate candidate in Maryland. The organization folded in late 2007.

References

External links 
 November 2002 democracyrising.org web site from Archive.org
 October 2007 DemocracyRising.US web site from Archive.org
 Protesting Capitalism on Wall Street- October 7th, 2002 from TheNation.com
 Failed re-election candidate may seek Green Party presidential nomination September 12th, 2002 from OnlineAthens.com
 Greens to Run Presidential Candidate in 2004, But Who? July, 2002 from baltimorechronicle.com
 How Nader made me an anarchist August 7th, 2001 from Indymedia.org 
 Ralph Nader Democracy Rising Rallies 2001-2003 from GWU.edu

Organizations established in 2001
American political blogs
Anti–Iraq War groups
Ralph Nader
Organizations disestablished in 2007